Willie Penrose (born 1 August 1956) is a former Irish Labour Party politician who served as Chairman of the Labour Parliamentary Party from 2016 to 2020 and a Minister of State from March 2011 to November 2011. He served as a Teachta Dála (TD) from 1992 to 2020.

Education and professional career
Penrose was born in Ballynacargy, County Westmeath, in 1956. He was educated at Coláiste Mhuire, Mullingar, Multyfarnham Agricultural College, University College Dublin (UCD), and the King's Inns. At UCD, he studied Agricultural Science, graduating in 1979 with a bachelor's degree; after graduation, with a colleague, he formed an agricultural consultancy firm in Mullingar. In 1986 he took up the position of advisor to the Minister of State at the Department of Fisheries, Forestry and Tourism, Michael Moynihan, resigning from the agricultural consultancy to do so.

He qualified as a barrister in 1990, before entering into national politics. He has published a book on agricultural law.

Political career

Westmeath County Council
In 1984, Penrose was co-opted on to Westmeath County Council, and a year later, he ran in the local elections, winning his seat in the Mullingar Lough Owel local electoral area by a margin of just six votes. In the 1991 local elections, he topped the poll in the Mullingar Rural Area.

Dáil Éireann: 1992–2020
At the 1992 general election, in which the Labour Party won a record 33 seats (later surpassed in 2011), he was first elected to the Dáil as a Labour Party TD for the Westmeath constituency.

In 2002, Penrose was a candidate for the deputy leadership of the Labour Party. Although he was part of a joint ticket with Pat Rabbitte, who won the leadership comfortably, he was narrowly defeated for the deputy leadership by Liz McManus, polling 1,636 votes to McManus's 1,728.

Minister of State: 2011
On 9 March 2011, he was appointed as Minister of State at the Department of Environment, Community and Local Government with special responsibility for Housing and Planning, attending meetings of the cabinet.

On 15 November 2011, he resigned as Minister of State due to his opposition to the government's decision to close Columb Barracks in Mullingar. Penrose said: "I understand and appreciate that significant efforts were made by my Labour colleagues in government, who fully understood the depths of my feelings in this regard, to resolve this matter, but to no avail." He also resigned the Labour parliamentary party whip.

2012–2020
In February 2012, The Phoenix magazine contrasted Penrose who "eats at the PLP tables in the Dáil restaurant and is often seen chatting to Gilmore on the corridors" with two other backbenchers who lost the party whip, Tommy Broughan and Patrick Nulty, both of whom had been "banished" from the Labour parliamentary offices. Penrose rejoined the parliamentary Labour Party in October 2013.

He was narrowly re-elected to the Dáil at the 2016 general election, one of just seven Labour TDs to secure election. On 5 July 2018, he announced that he would not contest the next general election. Alan Mangan was selected as his replacement for the 2020 general election, but Mangan was not elected.

References

External links
Willie Penrose's page on the Labour Party website

1956 births
Living people
Alumni of University College Dublin
Irish barristers
Labour Party (Ireland) TDs
Local councillors in County Westmeath
Members of the 27th Dáil
Members of the 28th Dáil
Members of the 29th Dáil
Members of the 30th Dáil
Members of the 31st Dáil
Members of the 32nd Dáil
Ministers of State of the 31st Dáil
Alumni of King's Inns